The McDonald Center at Sharp HealthCare (formerly Sharp Vista Pacifica) is the only medically supervised substance abuse recovery center in San Diego County that provides treatment for adults.

History
Sharp HealthCare acquired the facility in 1998. The facility is a 14-bed chemical dependency hospital.

Hospital features
Sharp McDonald Center is one of 4 medically supervised substance abuse recovery centers in San Diego, providing treatment for adults and their families. Located in the Serra Mesa area of San Diego, Sharp McDonald Center provides individually tailored support for drug rehabilitation and alcohol treatment, in a structured, homelike setting.

Services
• Aftercare Programs
• Chemical Dependency Services
• Continuing Care
• Evening Outpatient Sessions
• Family Care Program (including family education and counseling)
• Medically Supervised Detoxification and Rehabilitation
• Personalized Chemical Dependency Treatment

Medical firsts
In 1983, Sharp HealthCare created the first hospital-based program designed for the young children of alcoholics, and other chemically dependent parents, at Sharp McDonald Center.

References

Sha
Hospitals in San Diego
rp Expands Its Substance Abuse Centre

Sharp McDonald Center, PsychologyToday